David Osit (born May 6, 1987) is an Emmy and Peabody Award-winning American documentary filmmaker, editor and composer. His documentaries include Mayor and Thank You for Playing.

Life and career

Osit was raised in the suburbs of New York City in Tuckahoe (village), New York, where he graduated from Tuckahoe High School in 2005. Osit studied Middle Eastern and North African Studies at the University of Michigan where he was a Wallenberg Fellow, and studied Refugee Law at the American University in Cairo. His first documentary film, Building Babel, was filmed while Osit was in graduate school and followed real estate developer Sharif El-Gamal during the 2010 Ground Zero Mosque controversy. The film was broadcast on PBS in 2013. 

He is the director, along with co-director Malika Zouhali-Worrall, of the 2015 documentary Thank You for Playing. Osit and Zouhali-Worrall also directed "Games You Can't Win," a short film inspired by the feature for The New York Times Op-Docs. Both the feature and short were inspired by the art house video game That Dragon, Cancer. In 2017, Thank You For Playing won an Emmy Award for Outstanding Arts and Culture Documentary.

His third feature documentary, Mayor, follows Musa Hadid, the mayor of Ramallah, the de facto capital of Palestine. The film premiered at the True/False Film Festival in 2020, one of the last film festivals to proceed as scheduled in the first half of 2020 due to the Coronavirus pandemic. It was theatrically released on December 2, 2020, to critical praise. The film was a New York Times "Critic's Pick" and an Indiewire "Critic's Pick", and won an Emmy Award for Outstanding Politics & Government Documentary, and a 2022 Peabody Award.

Osit has edited and composed for numerous documentary films, including Live From New York!, which was the opening night film of the 2015 Tribeca Film Festival.

He was named to the 2020 Doc NYC "40 Under 40" list.

Influences

Osit has cited Roy Andersson, Elia Suleiman, Miloš Forman and Amir Naderi as influences on his work. He has referred to James Longley's Iraq in Fragments as a formative documentary for his generation of documentary filmmakers.

Filmography

References 

Living people
American documentary filmmakers
1987 births